Typhoon Cecil, known in the Philippines as Tropical Storm Rubing, was one of two typhoons to strike Vietnam within a week in 1985. Cecil originated from an area of convection that tracked west-northwest and passed south of Palau late on October 9. The disturbance became increasingly defined as it moved through the southern Philippines. On October 12, a tropical depression developed, and the next day, the depression was upgraded into a tropical storm. Cecil turned northwest over the open waters of the South China Sea as it steadily strengthened, and was classified as a typhoon on October 14. After unexpectedly slowing down, Cecil continued to intensify and at noon of October 14, reached its peak intensity of 145 km/h (90 mph). Land interaction with Vietnam triggered a weakening trend. After turning west, Cecil moved onshore just north of Huế at 22:00 UTC on October 15. After tracking into Laos, the typhoon dissipated 39 hours later.

Across Vietnam, 229,039 homes were damaged and 47,757 others were destroyed. At least 7,000 schools were damaged and 1,900 others were destroyed. Moreover, 70,000 t (77,160 short tons) of rice were wiped away. Overall, 769 people were killed, 128 were reported missing, and 200 were wounded. Approximately 3,000  ha (7,400 acres) of farmland were flooded and at least 225,000 others were left homeless. In all, damage was estimated at US$65 million. Typhoon Cecil was considered the worst natural disaster in the central portion of the country in history. Elsewhere, one person was killed in Thailand.

Meteorological history

Typhoon Cecil originated from an area of increasing convection on October 8. Satellite imagery showed a large area of curved convection near the equator from the 139th meridian east to the 145th meridian east. The disturbance tracked west-northwest, passing just south of Palau late on October 9. Aided by an excellent poleward outflow channel via an upper-level trough, the disturbance steadily organized. On the same day, the Japan Meteorological Agency (JMA) classified the system as a tropical depression. The disturbance became more defined as it passed through the islands of the southern Philippines. Early on October 12, the Joint Typhoon Warning Center (JTWC) issued a Tropical Cyclone Formation Alert for the system. Later that day the JMA upgraded the depression into a tropical storm. An increase in organization prompted the JTWC to classify the system as a tropical depression later that day, although post-season analysis revealed that Cecil was already a tropical storm by this time. At the time, the JTWC expected the cyclone to rapidly intensify over the South China Sea and strike Vietnam within three days.

After becoming a tropical storm, Cecil turned northwest over the open waters of the South China Sea along the southern edge of a ridge over eastern China and the East China Sea. The storm steadily intensified, with the JMA classifying the system as severe tropical storm at 00:00 UTC on October 13. After a Hurricane Hunter aircraft plane measured a pressure of  early on October 13, the JTWC upgraded Cecil to a typhoon at 18:00 UTC, with the JMA doing the same early the next day. Continuing to intensify, the typhoon cleared out an eye, which it would maintain until it struck land. Continuing to slowly track northwest as the ridge to its north was weaker than expected, Cecil passed south of Hainan Island that morning and, according to the JTWC, began to weaken due to its close proximity to Vietnam. However, the JMA estimated that no changed in strength occurred during this time. Cecil turned west as the ridge to its north built back in and contrary to expectations did not make landfall until moving onshore just north of Huế at 22:00 UTC on October 15. Cecil crossed into Laos two hours later and by 06:00 UTC on October 16, the JTWC ceased tracking the system. The JMA did the same 30 hours later.

Impact and aftermath
During its formative stages, 70 fishing boats sunk or were destroyed by the storm in Iloilo in the Philippines. The first of two typhoons to strike Vietnam in a week, Cecil demolished houses, downed power lines, and caused flooding that forced large-scale evacuations in central Vietnam, where five villages were completely destroyed. In the Nghệ Tĩnh and Quảng Nam Provinces, 485 homes were destroyed and 879 were damaged. Throughout the central portion of the country, 250 dispensaries and nearly 9,000 schools were destroyed. There, six hospitals and 250 medical stations were damaged and a 200-bed hospital was destroyed. Nationwide, 47,757 dwellings were destroyed, with an additional 229,039 homes were damaged. At least 7,000 schools were damaged and 1,900 others were destroyed. Throughout the area, 769 people were killed and 128 were reported missing while 257 were wounded. Around  of farmland were flooded and at least 225,000 others were left homeless. The typhoon was considered the worst natural disaster to strike the central portion of the nation. Damage was estimated at US$65 million. Heavy rains in Thailand caused flash flooding that resulted in one causality. There, Cecil was the second typhoon to strike the nation within a week, after Typhoon Andy.

Following Cecil, the Vietnamese government requested that the World Food Programme provide  worth of food. To combat the damage caused by the typhoon, the United Nations Development Programme and the United Nations Office for the Coordination of Humanitarian Affairs each contributed $30,000. Furthermore, Trócaire contributed $162,386. Caritas Internationalis provided  of rice and Oxfam gave  and 200,000 sweaters. The government of Australia awarded  of rice. Canada added $50,000 while France contributed  of wheat. The British Red Cross provided $60,000 while the United States-based Vision International contributed $50,000 worth of clothes, medicine, and building material. Japan offered $200,000 in emergency aid.

See also

 Typhoon Cecil (1982) – other tropical cyclone named Cecil, which affected Japan and South Korea
 Tropical Storm Cecil (1989) – another tropical cyclone with the same name that also severely impacted the same area 4 years after
 Typhoon Nancy (1982)

Notes

References

1985 Pacific typhoon season
Typhoons in the Philippines
Typhoons in Vietnam
Typhoon Cecil
Typhoon Cecil
Cecil
Cecil
Cecil